Nymphicula albidorsalis is a moth in the family Crambidae. It was described by Speidel in 1998. It is found in the Philippines (Samar).

References

Nymphicula
Moths described in 1998